Louis King (June 28, 1898 – September 7, 1962) was an American actor and film director of westerns and adventure movies in the 1920s, 1930s, and 1940s.

Biography
King was born in Christiansburg, Virginia. His name was also written as L.H. King and Lewis King. A brother of director Henry King, he entered the film business in 1919 as a character actor. He specialized in villains and blusterers. He began his career as a director of a series of westerns in the 1920s under the name of Lewis King: The Bantam Cowboy (1928), The Fightin' Redhead (1928), The Pinto Kid (1928), The Little Buckaroo (1928), The Slingshot Kid (1927), The Boy Rider (1927), Montana Bill (1921), Pirates of the West (1921), and The Gun Runners (1921).

He directed action adventures and westerns in the 1930s and 1940s in Hollywood. He directed the 20th Century Fox wartime film Chetniks! The Fighting Guerrillas in 1943. In the 1950s, he directed westerns on television. He directed episodes of Gunsmoke in 1957, the Zane Grey Theater in 1958, The Adventures of Wild Bill Hickok, and The Deputy in 1960–61.

Partial filmography

 Rosemary Climbs the Heights (1918)
 The Valley of Tomorrow (1920)
 The Gun Runners (1921)
 Ever Since Eve (1921)
 Singing River (1921)
 Watch Your Step (1922)
 Main Street (1923)
 Let's Go (1923)
 The Law Rustlers (1923)
 Spawn of the Desert (1923)
 The Printer's Devil (1923)
 The Devil's Cargo (1925)
 The Boy Rider (1927)
 The Pinto Kid (1928)
 The Little Buckaroo (1928)
 Orphan of the Sage  (1928)
 The Bantam Cowboy (1928)
 Young Whirlwind  (1928)
 The Fightin' Redhead (1928)
 Rough Ridin' Red (1928)
 The Freckled Rascal  (1929)
 The Vagabond Cub (1929)
 Mexicali Rose (1929)
 Men Without Law (1930)
 The Lone Rider (1930)
 The Mask Falls (1931)
 Desert Vengeance (1931)
 Police Court (1932)
 The Arm of the Law (1932)
 Drifting Souls (1932)
 The County Fair (1932)
 Life in the Raw (1933)
 Bachelor of Arts (1934) 
 Murder in Trinidad (1934)
 Charlie Chan in Egypt (1935)
 Angelina o el honor de un brigadier (1935) in Spanish
 Bengal Tiger (1936)
 Bulldog Drummond's Revenge (1937)
 Wine, Women and Horses (1937)
 Bulldog Drummond Comes Back (1937)
 Tom Sawyer, Detective (1938)
 The Way of All Flesh (1940)
 Typhoon (1940)
 Young America (1942)
 Chetniks! The Fighting Guerrillas (1943)
 Thunderhead, Son of Flicka (1945)
 Smoky (1946)
 Thunder in the Valley (1947) 
 Green Grass of Wyoming (1948)
 Sand (1949)
 Mrs. Mike (1949)
 Powder River (1953)
 Sabre Jet (1953)
 Dangerous Mission (1954)
 Massacre (1956)

References

External links

1962 deaths
1898 births
People from Christiansburg, Virginia
Male actors from Virginia
Film directors from Virginia
Burials at Westwood Village Memorial Park Cemetery
20th-century American male actors